Tucker Hill is an unincorporated community in Westmoreland County, in the U. S. state of Virginia.

The Yeocomico Church was listed on the National Register of Historic Places in 1969.

References

GNIS entry

Unincorporated communities in Virginia
Unincorporated communities in Westmoreland County, Virginia